Urophora sinica is a species of tephritid or fruit flies in the genus Urophora of the family Tephritidae.

Distribution
China

References

Urophora
Insects described in 1938
Diptera of Asia